Kalyan Chowdhury (born 9 November 1951) is an Indian former cricketer. He played nineteen first-class matches for Bengal between 1970 and 1979.

See also
 List of Bengal cricketers

References

External links
 

1951 births
Living people
Indian cricketers
Bengal cricketers
Cricketers from Kolkata